Bi Jingjing (born 1954) is a lieutenant general in the People's Liberation Army of China. He was a member of the 13th National Committee of the Chinese People's Political Consultative Conference.

Biography
Bi was born in Beijing, in 1954, while his ancestral home in Huantai County, Shandong. At the end of 1968, during the Cultural Revolution, Bi, alongside Ren Zhiqiang and others, was sent to Yan'an County (now Yan'an), Shaanxi to do farm works as sent-down youth. At that time, he was only 14 years old, becoming the youngest sent-down youth in Yan'an County. He enlisted in the People's Liberation Army (PLA) in 1970 and mainly served in the PLA National Defence University. He was promoted to become its vice president in December 2012, and served until July 2017.

He was promoted to the rank of major general (shaojiang) in July 2005 and lieutenant general (zhongjiang) in July 2014.

Publications

References

1954 births
Living people
People's Liberation Army generals from Beijing
People's Republic of China politicians from Beijing
Chinese Communist Party politicians from Beijing
Members of the 13th Chinese People's Political Consultative Conference